Rolandos Liatsos (born May 30, 1990, Cyprus) is a Cypriot stage actor. He started his career at the age of 17 with Shakespeare’s play “A Midsummer Night's Dream” and suddenly made his breakthrough starring in Iakovos Kambanellis’ masterpiece “Stella With the Red Gloves.” After the big success of this play Rolandos moved to Coventry where he starred in  “The Tempest” and soon after starred in his opera prima as a director and writer of “Unpublished by Alex.” This play catapulted him to Los Angeles, CA to work with Academy Award Winner Milton Justice in the play “Woman in Mind.” Soon after he starred in Tennessee Williams’ play “The Rose Tattoo” directed by the acclaimed actor and director Yorgos Karamihos. With his extensive theater experience focusing on various styles, including: outdoor theater, experimental, Shakespeare, Physical theater, and Naturalism, he was able to bring to life Arturo Ui, a character based on Adolf Hitler in Bertolt Brecht's play "The Resistible Rise of Arturo Ui." In this political satire of the German writer, Rolandos gave his most successful performance yet.

A few of his latest film projects include "Even when I’m Sleeping,” "Social Norm," and "Three Hitmen," While in the U.K. he worked professionally with “The Fabularium” and KILN theater company.

Filmography 
 Social Norm, (2015) as Terry.
 Losses (short), (2015) as Brian.
 Here I Stand, (short), (2015) as Justin Miller. 
 Three Hitmen (Short), (2014) as Jenson. 
 Hills like White Elephant, (2014) as Michael Clark.
 We Love Cyprus (Documentary), (2013) as himself. 
 Even When Im Sleeping, 2012 as Thomas.

Theater work 
 The Resistible Rise of Arturo Ui, (2014) as Arturo Ui,
 The Rose Tattoo, (2014) as Alvaro Mangiacavallo,
 Hurlyburly, (2013) as Eddie,
 Woman in Mind, (2013) as Rick,
 "Unpublished" by Alex, (2012) as Alex.
 The Grim Tales, (2011. 2012).
 End of The World, (2011)
 The Tempest, (2010) as Caliban.
 DWEEB, (2010).
 Arabian Nights, (2009).
 Stella With the Red Gloves, (2009).
 A Midsummer Night's Dream, (2007).

Education 
 in 2012 Rolandos Liatsos graduated with a BA in Theater and Professional Practice, From Coventry University, Coventry,UK.
 In 2014 Rolandos Liatsos graduated from the 2 year Conservatory at Stella Adler Academy.

References

1990 births
Living people
Cypriot stage actors
21st-century Cypriot male actors
Cypriot male stage actors
Place of birth missing (living people)
Cypriot male film actors